QTA may refer to:

Quidditch Through the Ages
QuickTime Alternative